The Naturalization Law of 1802 (enacted April 14, 1802) was passed by the United States Congress to amend the residency and notice periods of the previous Naturalization Act of 1798. It restored the less prohibitive provisions of the Naturalization Act of 1795, namely reducing the required residency period for aliens to become eligible to be naturalized citizens of the United States, from 14 years to 5, and cutting the Declaration of Intention minimum notice time from 5 years to 3.  The 1802 Act replaced the Naturalization Act of 1798, and provided:  
 The "free white person" requirement remained in place
 The alien had to declare, at least three years in advance, his intent to become a U.S. citizen.
 The previous 14-year residency requirement was reduced to 5 years.  
 Resident children of naturalized citizens were to be considered citizens
 Children born abroad of U.S. citizens were to be considered citizens
 Former British soldiers during the "late war" were barred unless the state legislature made an exception for them

References

1802 in American law
United States federal immigration and nationality legislation
7th United States Congress